Malmesbury Abbey, at Malmesbury in Wiltshire, England, is a religious house dedicated to Saint Peter and Saint Paul. It was one of the few English houses with a continuous history from the 7th century through to the dissolution of the monasteries.

Monastic history
In the later seventh century, the site of the Abbey was chosen by Maildubh, an Irish monk who established a hermitage, teaching local children. Toward the end of his life, in the late seventh century, the area was conquered by the Saxons. Malmesbury Abbey was founded as a Benedictine monastery around 676 by the scholar-poet Aldhelm, a nephew of King Ine of Wessex. The town of Malmesbury grew around the expanding Abbey and under Alfred the Great was made a burh, with an assessment of 12 hides.

In AD 941, King Æthelstan was buried in the Abbey. Æthelstan had died in Gloucester in October 939. The choice of Malmesbury over the New Minster in Winchester indicated that the king remained an outsider to the West Saxon court. A mint was founded at the Abbey around this time.

The Abbey developed an illustrious reputation for academic learning under the rule of abbots such as Aldhelm, John Scotus Eriugena, Alfred of Malmesbury and Aelfric of Eynsham.

The Abbey was the site of an early attempt at human flight when, during the early 11th century, the monk Eilmer of Malmesbury attached wings to his body and flew from a tower. Eilmer flew over 200 yards (200 m) before landing, breaking both legs. He later remarked that the only reason he did not fly further was the lack of a tail on his glider.

The Domesday Book of 1086 says of the Abbey: 
In Wiltshire: Highway (11 hides), Dauntsey (10 hides), Somerford Keynes (5 hides), Brinkworth (5 hides), Norton, near Malmesbury (5 hides), Brokenborough with Corston (50 hides), Kemble (30 hides—now in Glos.), Long Newnton (30 hides), Charlton (20 hides), Garsdon (3 hides), Crudwell (40 hides), Bremhill (38 hides), Purton (35 hides); (fn. 127) in Gloucestershire: Littleton - upon - Severn (5 hides); (fn. 128) and in Warwickshire: Newbold Pacey (3 hides). These lands were valued at £188 14s. in all and were assessed as 3 knights' fees.

The 12th-century historian William of Malmesbury was a monk at the Abbey.

Construction and structural collapse
The current Abbey was substantially completed by 1180. The 431 feet (131 m) tall spire, and the tower it was built upon, collapsed in a storm around 1500 destroying much of the church, including two-thirds of the nave and the transept.

Abbots

Parish church

The abbey, which owned  in the twenty parishes that constituted the Malmesbury Hundred, was closed at the Dissolution of the Monasteries in 1539 by Henry VIII and was sold, with all its lands, to William Stumpe, a rich merchant. He returned the abbey church to the town for continuing use as a parish church, and filled the abbey buildings with up to 20 looms for his cloth-weaving enterprise.

The west tower fell around 1550, demolishing the three westernmost bays of the nave. As a result of these two collapses, less than half of the original building stands today. During the English Civil War, Malmesbury suffered extensive damage evidenced by hundreds of pock-marks left by bullets and shot which can still be seen on the south, west and east sides of the building.

In 1949, the church was designated as a Grade I listed building. Historic England added it to their Heritage at Risk Register in 2022, stating that  the roofs of the nave and aisles were leaking and in need of repair.

Today Malmesbury Abbey is in full use as the parish church of Malmesbury, in the Diocese of Bristol. The remains still contain a fine parvise which holds some examples of books from the abbey library. The Anglo-Saxon charters of Malmesbury, though extended by forgeries and improvements executed in the abbey's scriptorium, provide source material today for the history of Wessex and the West Saxon church from the seventh century.

Vicars of St Paul's and the Abbey Church, Malmesbury
From 1301 until the mid-16th century, the parish church of Malmesbury was St. Paul's. This stood in what is now Birdcage Walk (its tower and steeple remains, and is now the Abbey belltower). In 1539 Malmesbury Abbey ceased to exist as a monastic community and in August 1541 Thomas Cranmer licensed the abbey church to replace St Paul's as the parish church of Malmesbury. In 1837 the ancient chapelries of Corston and Rodbourne were made into a separate parish, called St Paul Malmesbury Without, and St Mary Westport was united to the abbey church.

Organ
 
The earliest organ was obtained in 1846 and had formerly stood in the church of St Benet Fink, Threadneedle Street, London; it had been manufactured in 1714 by Abraham Jordan. In 1938 a new organ was provided by Henry Willis, which had formerly been owned by Sir George Alfred Willis, Baronet of Bristol. Eventually it too was replaced.

The current organ dates from 1984 and was built by E.J. Johnson of Cambridge at a cost of £71,000. A specification of the organ can be found on the National Pipe Organ Register.

Notable burials

Máel Dub, who founded the first monastic community in Malmesbury and gave his name to the town. His bones were cast out of the church of St. Peter and St. Paul by the Norman abbot Warin of Lyre, and relegated to a far corner of St. Michael's Church.
Aldhelm, first Bishop of Sherborne and saint
 Æthelwine and Ælfwine, sons of Æthelweard (son of Alfred)
 Æthelstan, regarded as the first king of England. He was buried in the tower, under the altar of St. Mary. According to William of Malmesbury, Æthelstan's body was disinterred in the 11th century and reburied in the abbot's garden (now Abbey House Gardens) to avoid Norman desecration. He is commemorated by an empty 15th century tomb in the north aisle.
 Daniel, Bishop of Winchester
Hannah Twynnoy, supposedly the first person to be killed by a tiger in England, is buried in the churchyard, her gravestone inscribed with a poem. She was killed on 23 October 1703 after teasing a tiger in a menagerie stabled in the White Lion public house where she worked.<ref>Plumb, C., 2015, The Georgian Menagerie: Exotic Animals in Eighteenth-Century London”.</ref>
 Roger Scruton, a writer and philosopher who lived near Malmesbury, was buried in the churchyard in 2020.

Legacy
In 2009, historian Michael Wood speculated that Malmesbury Abbey was the site of transcription of the Anglo-Saxon epic poem Beowulf.

See also
 List of English abbeys, priories and friaries serving as parish churches
 Monk of Malmesbury
 The Old Bell, Malmesbury

Images

Notes

References

Smith, M Q: The Sculptures of the South Porch of Malmesbury Abbey: A Short Guide, 1975

External links

Malmesbury Abbey at Window on Wiltshire's Heritage
Image directory of Malmesbury Abbey at ArtServe
Malmesbury Abbey at The Normans: A European People''

 
670s establishments
Christian monasteries established in the 7th century
Anglo-Saxon monastic houses
Buildings and structures completed in 1180
Monasteries in Wiltshire
Benedictine monasteries in England
1539 disestablishments in England
Tourist attractions in Wiltshire
Grade I listed churches in Wiltshire
Abbey
7th-century establishments in England
Monasteries dissolved under the English Reformation